This is a list of lakes of China.

Lakes of China include:

See also

List of saltwater lakes of China
Five Lakes (China)
Lake Tianchi Monster

External links
Hangzhou West Lake description, photo gallery and maps
https://web.archive.org/web/20030808171438/http://www.hceis.com/ChinaBasic/Lakes/Lakes%20of%20China.htm